Winter David Warden (26 November 1860 – 3 June 1936) was an Australian politician and a member of the New South Wales Legislative Council for the Nationalist Party of Australia for 17 years.

Early life
Warden was born in Ulladulla, New South Wales, the son of David Warden, land and ship building yard owner, and Grace Buchan. His uncle, James Warden, was a Member of the Legislative Assembly. He was one of seven brothers and attended Newington College commencing in 1875 whilst the school was situated at Newington House on the Parramatta River. His younger brother, Colonel Alfred Warden VD (1868 – 1955), was a soldier, military engineer and architect.

Career
After school he became a dairy farmer at Milton, New South Wales. He was chairman of Coastal Farmers' Co-operative Society Limited, a member of the Producers' Distributing Society Limited, a director of Co-operative Insurance Company of Australia Limited, a committee member of Royal Agricultural Society of New South Wales and a member of the Milton Agricultural and Horticultural Association.

References

1860 births
1936 deaths
Members of the New South Wales Legislative Council
Nationalist Party of Australia members of the Parliament of New South Wales
People educated at Newington College